The Wilson Elementary School District is a small elementary school district in Phoenix, Arizona. It operates a K-3 primary school and a 4-8 elementary school.

References

External links
 

School districts in Phoenix, Arizona
School districts in Maricopa County, Arizona